= C. Frank Miller =

American politician (1933–2020)

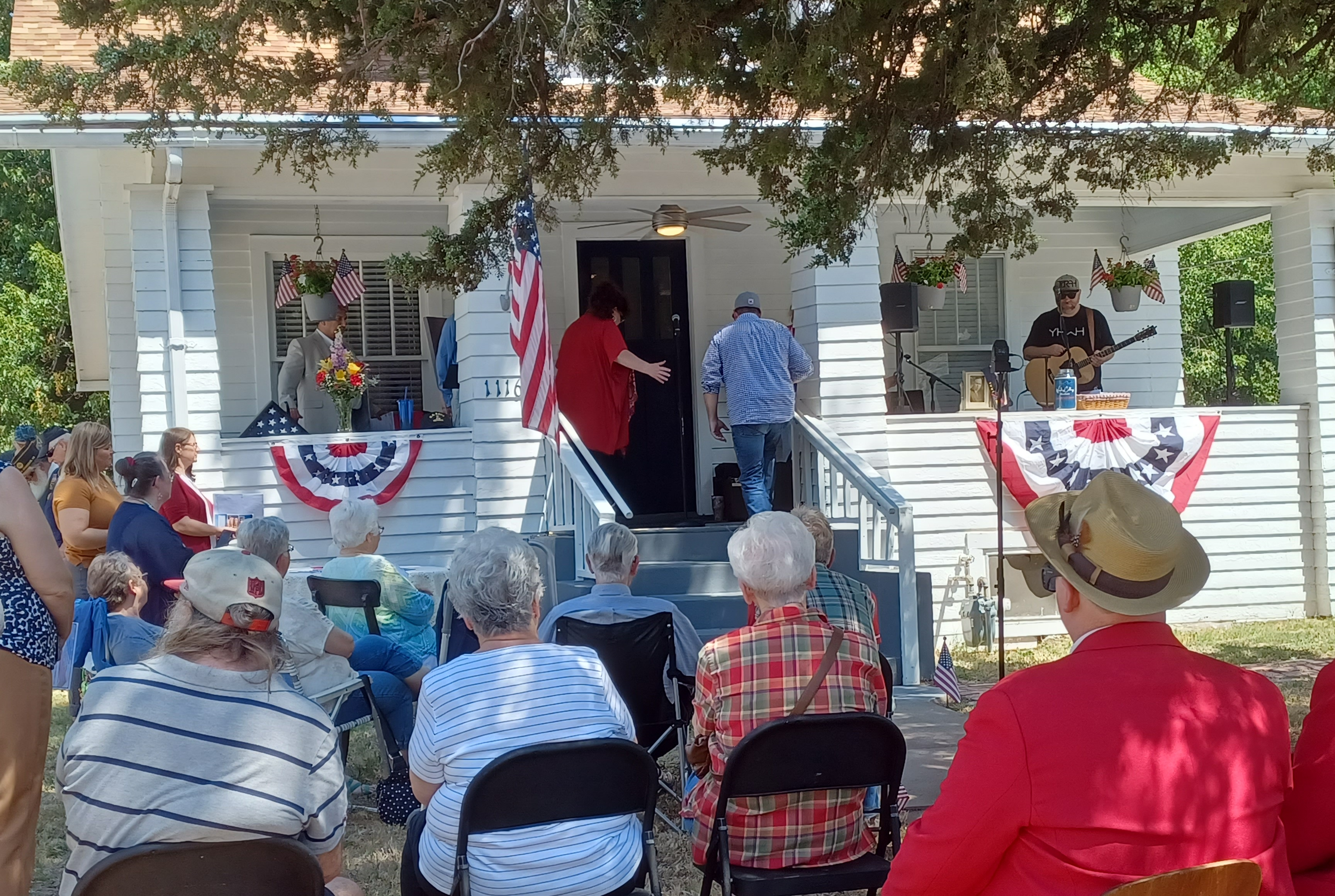
Miller House for Veterans ribbon cutting and dedication on August 25, 2022

C. Frank Miller (July 3, 1933 - May 22, 2020) was a Republican state representative for the 12th district in the Kansas House of Representatives from 2001 to 2006. He was born in Barranquilla, Colombia to Presbyterian missionaries Ruth and Bill Miller. Miller's home was donated by his heirs to the HSH (Home Sweet Home) Homeless Ministry Project, Inc. and is now the Miller House for Veterans.
